Odo of Paris may refer to:
 Odo, Count of Paris (860 - 898) 
 Odo, Duke of Burgundy (944 – 965)